The Lost Episodes is a 1996 posthumous album by Frank Zappa which compiles (with the exception of "I Don't Want to Get Drafted" and "Any Way the Wind Blows") previously unreleased material. Much of the material covered dates from early in his career, and as early as 1958, into the mid-1970s. Zappa had been working on these tracks in the years before his death in 1993.

Album content 
The album is also notable for its five tracks which feature Captain Beefheart (known in early recordings by his birth name, Don Vliet, and later Don Van Vliet): "Lost in a Whirlpool", a blues parody from around 1958–59 in which Beefheart sings of being flushed down the toilet; "Tiger Roach", a rhythm and blues track from around three years later; "I'm a Band Leader" from 1969, a spoken word piece written by Zappa and read by Beefheart; "Alley Cat", a blues number in which Zappa plays guitar with two members of Beefheart's Magic Band, and "The Grand Wazoo", a spoken word piece recorded in 1969, to which Zappa added a Synclavier track in 1992 . Dan Glaister, writing in The Guardian, judged the first to be "a passable Bessie Smith cover", adding, "while "Alley Cat" could be a missing track from Clear Spot."

Elsewhere on the disc are included a number of alternate, earlier versions of compositions which were later released on Zappa's studio albums. The Lost Episodes''' version of "Any Way the Wind Blows", for instance, was recorded in Cucamonga in around 1963—three years before its appearance on Freak Out! (1966). And the version of "Fountain of Love" here was recorded around the same time, but not released until Cruising with Ruben & the Jets (1968).  Several outtakes include the original versions of: "Inca Roads" and "RDNZL", along with a version of Wino Man featuring Ricky Lancelotti on lead vocals.  The final track is the original version of Sharleena from the aborted 2nd Hot Rats LP recordings in 1970; featuring Sugarcane Harris on lead vocal.

Some of the tracks had been previously released on the Mystery Disc, which was originally part of The Old Masters box set and was released on CD in 1998.  "Run Home Slow" is heard in stereo on The Lost Episodes but in mono on Mystery Disc (and probably a different take). "Charva" is heard in mono on The Lost Episodes but in stereo on Mystery Disc. "Wedding Dress Song" and Handsome Cabin Boy" are the same versions as on Mystery Disc'' but on the latter album the two songs feature as one track.

Track listing 
All songs written, composed and arranged by Frank Zappa except where noted.

Personnel 

 Frank Zappa – synthesizer, guitar, percussion, piano, celeste, drums, bass guitar, kazoo, vocals, background vocals, synclavier
 Dale Bozzio – vocals
 Terry Bozzio – vocals
 Captain Beefheart (Don Van Vliet) – vocals
 Ray Collins – vocals
 Ricky Lancelotti – vocals
 Ray White – vocals
 Kenny Williams – vocals
 Ronnie Williams – vocals
 Ronny Williams – vocals
 Ike Willis – vocals
 Elliot Ingber – slide guitar
 Elwood Madeo Jr. – guitar
 Bobby Zappa – guitar, rhythm guitar
 George Duke – keyboards
 Tommy Mars – keyboards, vocals
 Don Preston – keyboards
 Danny Helferin – piano
 Terry Wimberly – piano
 Arthur Barrow – bass, bass guitar
 Max Bennett – bass, bass guitar
 Erroneous (aka  Alex Dmochowski) – bass, bass guitar
 Roy Estrada – bass, bass guitar
 Tom Fowler – bass guitar
 Jimmy Carl Black – drums
 Vinnie Colaiuta – drums
 Aynsley Dunbar – drums
 John French – drums
 John Guerin – drums
 Ralph Humphrey – drums
 Chester Thompson – drums
 Tony Rodriguez – alto sax
 Chuck Foster – trumpet
 Sal Marquez – trumpet
 Bruce Fowler – trombone
 Don "Sugarcane" Harris – violin, vocals, electric violin
 Jean-Luc Ponty – violin
 Art Tripp – marimba, background vocals, vibraphone
 Ian Underwood – percussion, keyboards, saxophone, woodwind, fender rhodes
 Ruth Underwood – percussion

Production 

 Frank Zappa – arranger, producer, engineer
 Paul Buff – engineer
 Gary Kellgren – engineer
 Kerry McNabb – engineer
 Bob Stone – engineer, remixing
 Spencer Chrislu – remixing
 Gábor Csupó – artwork
 Steven Jurgensmeyer – design
 Hal Wilson – photography
 Rip Rense – liner notes

References

External links 
 Lyrics and information
 Release details

Compilation albums published posthumously
Frank Zappa compilation albums
1996 compilation albums
Rykodisc compilation albums